Paul Cruchet (25 September 1875, Montpreveyres – 31 March 1964, Morges) was a Swiss mycologist who specialized in parasitic fungi. His father, Denis Cruchet (1847–1926), was a minister and amateur mycologist.

In 1906 his received his doctorate in sciences at the University of Lausanne, and afterwards worked as a secondary school teacher in Payerne (from 1906) and Morges (from 1922). In 1924/25 he was president of the Société Vaudoise Sciences Naturelles (SVSN).

Selected writings 
 Note sur deux nouveaux parasites du Polygonum alpinum, L. Bulletin de l’Herbier Boissier Série 2 7: 245-247, (1908).
  Contribution à l’étude de la flore cryptogamique du Canton du Valais, Bulletin de la Murithiènne 37: 10 pp., 1 fig (1911); with Denis Cruchet and Eugéne Mayor.
 Contribution à l’étude des champignons du Valais. Bull. Murithiènne 37: 94-99 (1912).
 Contribution à l’étude des uredinées. Mykologisches Zentralblatt 3: 209-214, 2 figs (1913).
 Deux urédinées nouvelles. Bulletin de la Société Vaudoise de Sciences Naturelles 51: 73-79, 4 figs (1916).
 Contribution à l’étude des champignons parasites de l’engadine. Jahrber. Naturf. Gesellsch. Graubunden N.F. 58: 12 pp (1918); with Eugéne Mayor.
 Herborisation mycologique à Montorge et au Sanetoch en août 1919. Bull. Murithiènne 41: 67-69 (1921).

References 

1875 births
1964 deaths
People from Lavaux-Oron District
University of Lausanne alumni
Swiss mycologists